Kate Jenner (born 5 May 1990, in Mudgee) is an Australian field hockey player.  She represented Australia at the 2012 Summer Olympics.  She was part of Australia's gold medal winning team at the 2014 Commonwealth Games, although she herself missed a penalty in the shootout that decided the gold medal match.

Jenner qualified for the Tokyo 2020 Olympics. She was part of the Hockeyroos Olympics squad. The Hockeyroos lost 1-0 to India in the quarterfinals and therefore were not in medal contention.

References

External links
 

1990 births
Living people
Australian female field hockey players
Field hockey players at the 2012 Summer Olympics
Olympic field hockey players of Australia
Field hockey players at the 2010 Commonwealth Games
Field hockey players at the 2014 Commonwealth Games
Commonwealth Games medallists in field hockey
Commonwealth Games gold medallists for Australia
People from Mudgee
Field hockey players at the 2020 Summer Olympics
Sportswomen from New South Wales
21st-century Australian women
Medallists at the 2010 Commonwealth Games
Medallists at the 2014 Commonwealth Games